Vejoz, Wejwus, or Wehwos may refer to:
 Vejoz people
 Vejoz language

Language and nationality disambiguation pages